The 1922 Columbia Lions football team was an American football team that represented Columbia University as an independent during the 1922 college football season. In his third and final season, head coach Frank "Buck" O'Neill led the team to a 5–4 record, though the Lions were outscored  by opponents.  

The team played most of its home games on South Field, part of the university's campus in Morningside Heights in Upper Manhattan.

Schedule

References

Columbia
Columbia Lions football seasons
Columbia Lions football